Roberto Daniel Villamarín Mora (born 25 September 1997) is a Peruvian footballer who plays as a right back for Deportivo Binacional.

References

External links
 
 
 
 
 Roberto Villamarín at La Republica 
 

1997 births
Living people
Association football defenders
Peruvian footballers
Peruvian expatriate footballers
Peruvian Primera División players
Universidad Técnica de Cajamarca footballers
Atlas F.C. footballers
Club Alianza Lima footballers
Carlos A. Mannucci players
Ayacucho FC footballers
Peruvian expatriate sportspeople in Mexico
Expatriate footballers in Mexico